Abdul Maroof Gullestani (born 8 June 1986) is an Afghan football player. He has played for Afghanistan national team.

National team statistics

External links

Living people
Afghan footballers
1986 births
Association football defenders
Afghanistan international footballers